The 17th government of Turkey (10 June 1948 – 16 January 1949) was a short-term government in the history of Turkey. It is also known as the second Saka government.

Background 
Hasan Saka of the Republican People's Party (CHP), who was the previous prime minister, resigned on 8 June 1948. However, he was again assigned to form a government. His cabinet was not very different from the previous cabinet. The major addition was Nihat Erim, who was seen as the potential new leader of the party.

The government was given a vote of confidence from the Parliament on 18 June 1948.

The government
The members of the 17th government were as follows:

In the list below, the cabinet members who served only a part of the cabinet's lifespan are shown in the column "Notes".

Aftermath
The Republican People's Party (CHP) was losing ground to the Democrat Party (DP), and CHP was looking for a more charismatic prime minister. After preparing a new election (which would prove to be disadvantageous to CHP in 1950), Saka resigned on 14 January 1949.

References

Cabinets of Turkey
Republican People's Party (Turkey) politicians
1948 establishments in Turkey
1949 disestablishments in Turkey
Cabinets established in 1948
Cabinets disestablished in 1949
Members of the 17th government of Turkey
8th parliament of Turkey
Republican People's Party (Turkey)